Elyes Jelassi (born 7 February 1994) is a Tunisian football midfielder who currently plays for Al Masry SC.

References

1994 births
Living people
Tunisian footballers
Stade Tunisien players
Espérance Sportive de Tunis players
US Monastir (football) players
Association football midfielders
Tunisian Ligue Professionnelle 1 players
Tunisia international footballers